"My Baby's Got Good Timing" is a song co-written and recorded by American country music artist Dan Seals.  It was released in October 1984 as the second single from his album San Antone.  It peaked at #2, thus becoming his first top 5 hit.  The song was written by Seals and Bob McDill.

Charts

Weekly charts

Year-end charts

References

1984 singles
Dan Seals songs
Songs written by Bob McDill
Songs written by Dan Seals
Song recordings produced by Kyle Lehning
EMI America Records singles
1984 songs